Henderson Executive Airport  is a public use government airport located in Henderson, Nevada, 13 miles south of Las Vegas, in Clark County, Nevada. The airport is owned by the Clark County Commission and operated by the Clark County Department of Aviation. The FAA's National Plan of Integrated Airport Systems for 2009-2013 categorized it as a reliever airport. 

It was founded by Arby Alper in 1967 on 912 acres purchased from the city of Henderson, and opened in 1970 as Sky Harbor Airport. Clark County bought the airport in 1996 and renamed it Henderson Executive Airport. 

Most U.S. airports use the same three-letter location identifier for the FAA and IATA, but Henderson Executive Airport is HND to the FAA and HSH to the IATA (which assigned HND to Haneda Airport in Tokyo, Japan). The airport's ICAO identifier is KHND.

Facilities

In the year ending September 30, 2015 the airport had 71,323 aircraft operations, average 195 per day: 86% general aviation, 14% air taxi and <1% military. 252 aircraft were then based at the airport: 81% single-engine, 12% multi-engine, 7% jet and 3% helicopter.

The terminal has car rental, flight school, line service facilities and the Landings Restaurant.

References

External links
 Henderson Executive Airport, Official website
 Aerial photo as of June 1994 from USGS The National Map
   from Nevada DOT
 
 
 Businesses based at Henderson Executive:
 Desert Flying Club - Nevada Non-Profit, Official website

 NOAA/NWS current weather conditions

Airports in Clark County, Nevada
Buildings and structures in Henderson, Nevada
Transportation in Henderson, Nevada
Transportation in the Las Vegas Valley